The following television stations broadcast on digital or analog channel 47 in Canada:

 CBXFT-DT in Edmonton, Alberta
 CFHD-DT in Montreal, Quebec
 CFMT-DT in Toronto, Ontario
 CHNU-DT in Fraser Valley, British Columbia
 CJOH-TV-47 in Pembroke, Ontario

47 TV stations in Canada